Fanny Dénoix or Fanny Dénoix des Vergnes (1798-1879) was a French poet and writer who was lauded as "the muse of the Oise," the site of her well known poem, Jeanne Hachette, or the siege of Beauvais.

Biography 
Fanny was born Marie-Françoise Descampeaux, in Luchy (Oise), France on May 5, 1798. Her father was Jean-Françoise Descampeaux and her mother, Marie-Jeanne Boutielle. Her father was the tutor for one of the sons of King Louis XV. From an early age, Fanny loved literature, preferring "the reveries of solitude to the distractions of the world."

Married first to Mr. Lavergnat, Fanny married a second time on 16 February 1818 to Mr. Dénoix des Vergnes, surgeon of the Royal Guard dragoons. From 1832 on, she published collections of poems under the name of Fanny Dénoix, Fanny Denoix (without the accent, which corresponds to the local pronunciation of her name) or Fanny Dénoix des Vergnes.

Correspondent 
Dénoix corresponded with many French intellectuals of the time including, Victor Hugo, Chateaubriand, Eugène Sue and Alphonse de Lamartine.

On 29 June 1832, as Dénoix was just exploring her poetic aspirations, she learned that the famed writer, François-René de Chateaubriand, had been imprisoned. According to an account by Countess Amable Tastu, Dénoix "flew to Paris, entered the hotel of the police prefecture, and despite the most severe orders, obstacles constantly raised, refusals a thousand times repeated, she reached the dungeon of the illustrious prisoner. Thrilled with confusion, emotion, happiness, she could finally contemplate the august features of the author of Rene, hearing the sound of his immortal voice and savoring the touching expression of his gratitude. Full of inexpressible delight, she returned to her province, exclaiming: "This day is the most beautiful of my life!" A correspondence ensued with the famed writer answering "in the most generous way." Some of those letters have been preserved.

Poet and writer 
In 1833, Dénoix published a poem, Jeanne Hachette, or the siege of Beauvais winning an award at the Toulouse Floral Games, and was described as a "young woman with born talent." In 1837, she published Why I am a Poet: To my detractors in the Memoirs of the Academy of Sciences, Letters and Arts of Amiens.

Dénoix produced her first poetry collection in 1837, Hours of Solitude, and perhaps her most ambitious endeavor was to translate into verse the Mysteries of Paris by Eugène Sue (1843). After the 1848 French revolution, Fanny Dénoix became actively involved in politics, publishing an ode to the army (1850), a collection of patriotic verses (1855), and a salute to Pierre-Joseph Proudhon (1858).

In 1851, in Beauvais, on the occasion of the erection of the statue to Jeanne Hachette (who was being remembered for her heroism in 1472), Dénoix read her renown poem about the heroine using "flaming stanzas that were reflected on the lips of the 'Muse de l'Oise,' with a superhuman enthusiasm." On that same occasion, the author bequeathed to the city the substantial sum of 5,000 francs with the stipulation that the interest would be awarded every four years to deserving poets. (To put that sum in perspective, in 1831, a working-class family could rent a small house for about 40 francs a year.) She took that opportunity to make the first awards: Paul Dupont-Sevres (200 fr), the unnamed author of a Latin poem "Ode to Jeanne Hachette" (200 fr.), and Laçroix de a Neuville-en-Ilez (100 fr). The prizes were awarded 1880-1914, ceasing with World War I.

Congress member 
Dénoix was a contributor to Flandre Illustrée and a member of several intellectual societies, notably the 1853 scientific congress, for which she authored a poem, To the city of Arras. According to Gerson, she was one of only three female members of the congress among 421 men. He notes that "women published less than two percent of historical monographs between 1866 and 1875, for instance. Their subordinate role in this patrimonial field suggests that they struggled to impose themselves within an amateurish realm that participated in a broader program of political exclusion."

Death 
Dénoix died in Beauvais, France on 17 January 1879, at about 82 years of age.

Honors 
 Awarded an honorable mention of the Academy of Floral Games of Toulouse for Jeanne Hachette, or the seat of Beauvais
Received an honorable mention from the Philotechnical Society, The Universal Exhibition, April 1868
 A street in the city of Beauvais (Rue Denoix des Vergnes) near the Jeu de Paume was named after her in 1882. The plaque on display there spells her name Denoix, without an accent.

Selected works 
Among her many books, poems and letters, the author's name is spelled Dénoix or Denoix (without the accent).

The Holly Fountain, by Fanny Dénoix
Jeanne Hachette, or the siege of Beauvais, a poem by Fanny Denoix
The Brothers of Christian doctrine in Beauvais, letter to the Progress of the Somme by Fanny Denoix Vergnes
Gisors-Neauffles, by Fanny Dénoix
To Napoleon III, by Fanny Dénoix des Vergnes
To HM the Empress of Mexico, by Fanny Dénoix des Vergnes
Jefferson Davis before the High Court of Justice, by Fanny Dénoix des Vergnes
M. de Cavour, by Fanny Dénoix des Vergnes
To Victor Hugo, by Fanny Dénoix des Vergnes
The Return, by Fanny Dénoix des Vergnes
Without fear and without reproach, poetry, by Fanny Dénoix des Vergnes
Hours of solitude, poems by Fanny Denoix, 1837
The Council, letters written in the Journal d'Amiens, by Fanny Dénoix des Vergnes
Warriors and sentimental, poems by Fanny Denoix
Honor to you! Virtues, Courage, Glory, by Fanny Dénoix des Vergnes
Mysteries of Paris (from the novel Les Mystères de Paris by Eugène Sue), poem, by Fanny Dénoix, 1843
Compiègne, La Forêt, by Fanny Dénoix / Fanny Dénoix des Vergnes
Pierrefonds, by Fanny Dénoix
To the French Army, by Fanny Dénoix des Vergnes, 1850
Heart and Country, by Fanny Dénoix des Vergnes, 1855
Floods, by Fanny Dénoix des Vergnes, 1856
Cancan, by Fanny Dénoix des Vergnes, 1857
Stances, poem (for the inauguration of the Beauvais railway ), 1857
Beauvais, by Fanny Vergnes Denoix, 1858
Toby, Dog of Muse, to Milord, Dog of Czar, by Fanny Dénoix des Vergnes, 1865
Here and there, Historical Studies (including Visit to Monsieur de Chateaubriand), by Fanny Dénoix des Vergnes, 1865
Let the justice of a woman, by Fanny Vergnes Denoix (sic), 1866
My Politics, by Fanny Dénoix des Vergnes, 1867

References 

1798 births
1879 deaths
French women poets
19th-century French poets
19th-century French women writers
People from Oise
Pseudonymous women writers
19th-century pseudonymous writers